Retodus is an extinct genus of prehistoric lungfish found in Cretaceous-aged freshwater strata of Egypt (Baharija Formation), Algeria and Niger. The type species, R. tuberculatus, was named in 2006. It was originally named as a species of Ceratodus and Neoceratodus in 1963.

Description
Tooth plates of R. tuberculatus are characterised by four transverse ridges, broadly rounded crests, a reticular pattern of ridges and hollows, and large adult size.

See also

 Sarcopterygii
 List of sarcopterygians
 List of prehistoric bony fish

References

Prehistoric lobe-finned fish genera
Cretaceous fish of Africa
Fossil taxa described in 2006